FX was an Australian subscription television channel which focused on male-skewed television shows. The channel is owned and operated by Fox Networks Group and launched on 26 February 2012 on both Foxtel and Austar platforms.

On 12 June 2012 it was reported that a two-hour timeshift channel (FX + 2) would launch on 3 July 2012, but this was retracted for it to be later reported that it would launch on 6 September 2012.

On 28 February 2018, FX ceased broadcasting on Foxtel, with all of its programming moved to Fox Showcase.

History
On 9 October 2011 Fox International Channels released details that FX would relaunch in Australia early 2012 with "long-awaited" programs such as The Walking Dead, Transporter: The Series, and Hell on Wheels. The channel launched on 26 February on Foxtel and Austar.

SoHo, formerly known as FX until 2003, was owned by Foxtel, while this incarnation of FX was owned and ran by Fox International Channels (and later Fox Networks Group; the company which operate National Geographic, Nat Geo Wild, and Nat Geo People in Australia).

Promotion
On Wednesday 2 February 2012, FX announced on their Facebook page that to kick off the channels re-launch there would be promotional zombie invasions in Australia's two largest capital cities, Sydney and Melbourne on Wednesday 8 February 2012 in the city centres.

Programming

Final Programming

Acquired Programming
Anger Management
The Blacklist
Borgia
Burn Notice
Copper
Criminal Minds
Fargo
Fear the Walking Dead
The Following
Franklin & Bash
From Dusk till Dawn: The Series
Homeland
Hell on Wheels
Kingdom
The Last Ship
Las Vegas
Legends
Person of Interest
Sons of Anarchy
The Walking Dead

Past Programming

Original Programming
The Ultimate Fighter: The Smashes
The Ultimate Fighter Nations: Canada vs. Australia

Acquired Programming
10 Items or Less
Alias
American Horror Story
Arrested Development
Bedlam
The Booth at the End
Breaking Bad
The Bridge
Call Me Fitz
Chase
Ch:os:en
Da Vinci's Demons
Dark Angel
Dark Blue
The District
Endgame
E-Ring
Fear Itself
The Fixer
Hell on Wheels
House of Lies
Human Target
The Increasingly Poor Decisions of Todd Margaret
Jekyll
Justified
The Kill Point
Lead Balloon
Life on Mars
Low Winter Sun
Mad Dogs
Martial Law
NYPD Blue
Penn & Teller: Bullshit!
Prison Break
ReGenesis
Rescue Me
The Shield
The State Within
Transporter: The Series
The Tudors
UFC Unleashed
The Ultimate Fighter 10
The Ultimate Fighter 11
The Ultimate Fighter 12
The Ultimate Fighter 13
The Ultimate Fighter 14
The Ultimate Fighter 15
The Ultimate Fighter 16
The Ultimate Fighter 17
The Ultimate Fighter 18
The Unit
XIII

Notes

References

Television networks in Australia
Defunct television channels in Australia
Television channels and stations established in 2012
Television channels and stations disestablished in 2018
English-language television stations in Australia
Australia